Paul Troth (born c. 1962) is an American football coach and former player. He is the head football coach at Missouri Valley College in Marshall, Missouri, a position he had held since the 2002 season. Troth served as the head football coach at Huron University in Huron, South Dakota from 1997 to 2001. Troth played college football at William Jewell College in Liberty, Missouri, starring from 1981 to 1984 under head coach Vic Wallace.

Europe
Troth played quarterback for several seasons professionally in Europe most notably for the Amsterdam Crusaders, winning the 1991 Eurobowl championship. He first signed in 1985 with the East City Giants in the Finnish Vaahteraliiga.

Troth was subsequently an assistant coach under Wallace at University of St. Thomas in Minnesota and Lambuth University in Jackson, Tennessee.

Head coaching record

References

Year of birth missing (living people)
1960s births
Living people
Huron Screaming Eagles football coaches
Missouri Valley Vikings football coaches
Lambuth Eagles football coaches
St. Thomas (Minnesota) Tommies football coaches
William Jewell Cardinals football players
University of Memphis alumni
William Jewell College  alumni
American expatriate players of American football
American expatriate sportspeople in the Netherlands
American expatriate sportspeople in Finland